500 Miles Away from Home is a studio album by American country artist, Bobby Bare. It was released in December 1963 via RCA Victor and contained 12 tracks. It was the debut studio album of Bare's career and second with RCA Victor. The album's title track was released as a single in 1963. It became a top ten single on the American country, pop and adult contemporary music charts. The album itself reached the top ten of the American country albums chart. It received positive reception from AllMusic in later years following its original release.

Background, recording and content
Bobby Bare launched his career as a pop and rock singer with the 1958 top ten American single, "The All American Boy". Bare became increasingly dissatisfied with his musical choices and decided to relaunch himself as a country artist in the sixties. He signed with RCA Victor and had a crossover country pop single with "Detroit City" (1963). It was followed by a remake of the folk tune, "500 Miles Away from Home", which reached similar crossover commercial success. His debut studio album was named for "500 Miles Away from Home". The project was recorded at RCA Victor Studios in Nashville, Tennessee. The sessions were held between August and October 1963. They were produced by Chet Atkins.

The project contained a total of 12 songs. Along with the title track, a series of cover recordings were included on the album. Among them was A. P. Carter's "Homestead on the Farm" and the traditional folk song, "Worried Man Blues". Other covers included George Hamilton IV's "Abilene". Hamilton's original version topped the American country chart earlier in 1963. The album also featured a cover of Billy Grammer's 1958 top five country single, "Gotta Travel On". Original material was also featured, including two songs composed by Bare himself: "Let Me Tell You About Mary" and "Jeannie's Last Kiss".

Release, reception and singles

500 Miles Away from Home was originally released in December 1963 by RCA Victor. It was the debut studio album of Bare's career and his second with the label. RCA originally distributed the project as a vinyl LP, with six songs on each side of the record. Decades later, it was re-released for music download and streaming purposes. In its original release, the album spent nine weeks on the American Billboard Top Country Albums chart. It peaked at number nine on the chart the week of February 28, 1964 and became his second top ten album on the chart. It also became Bare's second album to chart the Billboard 200, peaking at the number 133 position on February 8, 1964.

500 Miles Away from Home was met with positive reception in later years from AllMusic. The publication rated the project 4.5 out of 5 possible stars. They also named the project's title track as an "album track pick". The only single included on the album was the title track, which was originally released by RCA Victor in September 1963. It became Bare's second top ten single on the Billboard Hot Country Songs chart, peaking at number five. Crossing over onto the Billboard Hot 100, it became his second top ten single on that chart as well, peaking at number ten. On the Billboard adult contemporary chart, the song reached the number four position.

Track listings

Vinyl version

Digital version

Chart performance

Release history

References

1963 debut albums
Albums produced by Chet Atkins
Bobby Bare albums
RCA Victor albums